Speckulation Entertainment is a British record label dedicated to musical theatre.  It was founded by Neil Eckersley who has released original cast recordings of A Spoonful of Stiles & Drewe, Stiles & Drewe's Peter Pan, Christmas in New York and Dougal Irvine's Departure Lounge.

Solo releases by West End artists include Julie Atherton: No Space for Air and Helena Blackman: The Sound of Rodgers & Hammerstein. Speckulation's recent album, Michael Bruce: Unwritten Songs, was promoted with the YouTube personality Portrait of a Princess and has received over a half million views to date. Speckulation's latest album is a live recording of Momentous Musicals which starred Gareth Gates. The original cast recording of Been on Broadway is expected for release in 2015.

References

Record labels established in 2008
British independent record labels
Musical theatre record labels
2008 establishments in the United Kingdom